Ernest Albert Nelson (9 September 1874 – 17 November 1915) was an Australian rules footballer who played with South Melbourne in the Victorian Football League (VFL).

Notes

External links 

1874 births
1915 deaths
Australian rules footballers from Victoria (Australia)
Sydney Swans players